Michael Stilo (born 8 November 1951) is a former Australian rules footballer who played with North Melbourne and South Melbourne in the Victorian Football League (VFL), and Brunswick in the Victorian Football Association (VFA), during the 1970s.

Stilo returned to Benalla as captain coach in 1983.

References

External links

1951 births
Living people
Australian rules footballers from Victoria (Australia)
North Melbourne Football Club players
Brunswick Football Club players
Sydney Swans players